Ahmad Vahidi (born 27 June 1958) is an Iranian military commander of the Revolutionary Guards and current Minister of Interior since August 25, 2021. In addition, he is currently member of the Expediency Discernment Council. 

In 1988, he was appointed as the commander of its extraterritorial special forces, Quds Force. He was the minister of defense under Mahmoud Ahmadinejad, having held the post from 3 September 2009 until 15 August 2013. Vahidi was formerly president of the Supreme National Defense University from August 2016 to 2021.

Early life and education
Vahidi was born on 27 June 1958 in Shiraz. His real name is Ahmad Shah Cheraghi (his nickname is Vahid). He holds a bachelor's degree in electronics and a master's degree in industrial engineering. He received a PhD in strategic studies from Imam Sadegh University.

Career
Vahidi joined Revolutionary Guards in 1979. He was made deputy to the then Revolutionary Guards commander Mohsen Rezai for intelligence affairs in 1981. The same year he was also named commander of the Balaal base. In 1983, he joined the Quds Force, a unit of the Revolutionary Guards that is responsible for operations outside of Iran. He holds the rank of brigadier general.

Vahidi was appointed deputy minister of defense in 2005 when Mostafa Mohammad-Najjar became minister of defense. He was in office until 2009. In August 2009, he was appointed minister of defense by President Mahmoud Ahmadinejad and on 3 September 2009, the Majlis endorsed Vahidi as minister of defense with vote of 227 of 286. He received 79.3% of the votes of the members of the parliament. Vahidi's term ended on 15 August 2013 and Hossein Dehghan replaced him in the post.

Controversies
Vahidi has been wanted by Interpol since 2007 for his alleged participation in the bombing of the Jewish community center in Buenos Aires, Argentina, on 18 July 1994, in which 85 people died. Vahidi was serving as the commander of a special unit of Iran's Revolutionary Guard known as the Quds Force when the attack occurred. He is one of five Iranians sought in the bombing. Iran denies that it was involved.

In June 2010, Vahidi was blacklisted by the U.S Government, a measure which is aimed at freezing the assets of proliferators of weapons of mass destruction (WMD) and their supporters, thereby isolating them from the U.S. financial and commercial systems.

In May 2011, Vahidi paid an official visit to Bolivia. Upon this event in June 2011, Bolivia apologized to Argentina for Ahmad Vahidi visiting the country, and announced that he would be leaving the country immediately.

In August 2021, Vahidi was made Interior Minister by then-newly elected president Ebrahim Raisi. This triggered condemnation from Argentina given his suspected role in the 1994 AMIA bombing, with the now former head of the Ministry of Foreign Affairs and Worship describing the appointment of Vahidi as "an insult to Argentina and a blow to the families of the victims" of the bombing. The Simon Wiesenthal Center in Los Angeles, California also issued a statement calling the appointment a setback for the families of the attack victims.

References

External links

1958 births
Living people
Islamic Revolutionary Guard Corps brigadier generals
Government ministers of Iran
Defence ministers of Iran
Quds Force personnel
Islamic Revolution Committees personnel
Iranian individuals subject to the U.S. Department of the Treasury sanctions